The UK Rock & Metal Albums Chart is a record chart which ranks the best-selling rock and heavy metal albums in the United Kingdom. Compiled and published by the Official Charts Company, the data is based on each album's weekly physical sales, digital downloads and streams. In 1996, there were 22 albums that topped the 52 published charts. The first number-one album of the year was Queen's fifteenth and final studio album Made in Heaven, which spent the first four weeks of the year atop the chart at the end of an eleven-week run beginning in November 1995. The final number-one album of the year was 18 til I Die, the seventh studio album by Bryan Adams, which spent the last six weeks of the year at number one in its fifth spell of the year.

The most successful album on the UK Rock & Metal Albums Chart in 1996 was 18 til I Die by Bryan Adams, which spent a total of 15 weeks at number one over five different spells. It was also the best-selling rock album of the year, ranking 24th in the UK End of Year Albums Chart. The self-titled debut album by Garbage spent six weeks at number one in 1996, and was the 25th best-selling album of the year. Queen's Made in Heaven was number one for four weeks of the year, while Status Quo's Don't Stop and To the Faithful Departed by The Cranberries each spent three weeks atop the chart. Four albums – Sepultura's Roots, Pearl Jam's No Code, Nirvana's From the Muddy Banks of the Wishkah and Skunk Anansie's Stoosh – each spent two weeks at number one.

Chart history

See also
1996 in British music
List of UK Rock & Metal Singles Chart number ones of 1996

References

External links
Official UK Rock & Metal Albums Chart Top 40 at the Official Charts Company
The Official UK Top 40 Rock Albums at BBC Radio 1

1996 in British music
UK Rock and Metal Albums
1996